"2080-luvulla" (English: In the 2080s) is a song by Finnish singer-songwriter Sanni and the lead single from her second studio album, Lelu. It was released on 13 February 2015 through Warner Music Finland, while its music video was released on 5 March. Its lyrics were written by Sanni, while the song was produced by Hank Solo. The song holds the record for longest consecutive run at number-one on the Finnish airplay charts of all-time with eleven weeks.

Charts

Weekly charts

References

2015 songs
2015 singles
Sanni (singer) songs
Warner Music Group singles